Events from the year 1950 in the United States.

Incumbents

Federal government 
 President: Harry S. Truman (D-Missouri)
 Vice President: Alben W. Barkley (D-Kentucky)
 Chief Justice: Fred M. Vinson (Kentucky)
 Speaker of the House of Representatives: Sam Rayburn (D-Texas)
 Senate Majority Leader: Scott W. Lucas (D-Illinois)
 Congress: 81st

Events

January–March

 January 5 – U.S. Senator Estes Kefauver introduces a resolution calling for an investigation of organized crime in the U.S.
 January 7 – A fire consumes Mercy Hospital in Davenport, Iowa, killing 41 patients.
 January 12 – Cold War: U.S. Secretary of State Dean Acheson delivers his "Perimeter Speech", outlining the boundary of U.S. security guarantees.
 January 17 – Great Brinks Robbery: 11 thieves steal more than $2,000,000 from an armored car in Boston, Massachusetts.
 January 21 – Accused communist spy Alger Hiss is convicted of perjury.
 January 24 – Cold War: Klaus Fuchs, German émigré and physicist, walks into London's War Office and confesses to being a Soviet spy: for seven years, he passed top secret data on American and British nuclear weapons research to the Soviet Union; formally charged February 2.
 January 31 – President Harry S. Truman orders the development of the hydrogen bomb, in response to the detonation of the Soviet Union's first atomic bomb in 1949.
 February 4 – Ingrid Bergman's illegitimate child arouses ire in the U.S.
 February 9 – Second Red Scare: In his speech to the Republican Women's Club at the McClure Hotel in Wheeling, West Virginia, Senator Joseph McCarthy accuses the U.S. State Department of being filled with 205 Communists.
 February 12 – Albert Einstein warns that nuclear war could lead to mutual destruction.
 February 13
 The U.S. Army begins to deploy anti-aircraft cannons to protect nuclear stations and military targets.
 The U.S. Air Force loses a Convair B-36 bomber carrying an Mk-4 atomic bomb off the west coast of Canada, producing the world's first Broken Arrow.
 February 15 – Walt Disney releases his twelfth animated feature film, Cinderella, in Hollywood. It is the first singular feature project his studio has produced since 1942's Bambi, following a string of six anthology films released to recoup losses due to World War II, and Disney's biggest commercial hit since 1937's Snow White and the Seven Dwarfs.
 March 1 – Klaus Fuchs is convicted in London of spying against both the UK and the United States for the Soviet Union, by giving to the latter top secret atomic bomb data.
 March 17 – University of California, Berkeley researchers announce the creation of element 98, which they have named "californium".
 March 22 – Frank La Salle is arrested in California for the abduction of Florence Sally Horner since 1948.
 March 23 – The 22nd Academy Awards ceremony, hosted by Paul Douglas, is held at RKO Pantages Theatre in Hollywood, Los Angeles. Robert Rossen's All The King's Men wins Best Picture, while Joseph L. Mankiewicz wins Best Director for A Letter to Three Wives. William Wyler's The Heiress receives and wins the most respective nominations and awards, with eight and four.

April–June

 April 14 – NSC 68 is issued by the United States National Security Council, advocating the development of the hydrogen bomb, increased military aid to America's allies, and the rollback of communist expansion.
 April 25 – The trial of alleged communist spy Judith Coplon commences in New York City.
 May 1 – First African American winner of a Pulitzer Prize: Gwendolyn Brooks wins the Pulitzer Prize for Poetry for her 1949 volume Annie Allen.
 May 9 – L. Ron Hubbard publishes Dianetics: The Modern Science of Mental Health.
 May 11 – The Kefauver Committee hearings into U.S. organized crime begin.
 May 14 – The Huntsville Times runs the headline, "Dr. von Braun Says Rocket Flights Possible to Moon".
 May 25 – The Brooklyn–Battery Tunnel is formally opened to traffic.
 June 1 – Mauna Loa in Hawaii starts erupting.
 June 5 – Sweatt v. Painter decided in the Supreme Court of the United States, challenging the "separate but equal" doctrine of racial segregation in education.
 June 22 – Red Channels: The Report of Communist Influence in Radio and Television is published.
 June 25 – Korean War: North Korean troops cross the 38th parallel into South Korea.
 June 27 – Korean War: U.S. President Harry S. Truman orders American military forces to aid in the defense of South Korea.
 June 28 – Korean War: North Korean forces capture Seoul.
 June 29 – United States v England (1950 FIFA World Cup): The United States men's national soccer team defeats England 1–0 in the 1950 FIFA World Cup in Brazil (Group 2 round).

July–September
 July 8 – G. Mennen Williams, the Governor of Michigan, is attacked and briefly held hostage while visiting Marquette Branch Prison, as part of an inmate escape plot.
 August 5 – A bomb-laden B-29 Superfortress crashes into a residential area in California; 17 are killed and 68 injured.
 August 8 – Winston Churchill expresses support for the idea of a pan-European army allied with Canada and the United States.
 August 23 – Legendary African American singer-actor Paul Robeson, whose passport has recently been revoked because of his alleged Communist affiliations, meets with U.S. officials in an effort to get it reinstated. He is unsuccessful, and it is not reinstated until 1958.
 August 25 – Althea Gibson becomes the first African American woman to compete at the U.S. National Championships (tennis).
 September 4
 The comic strip Beetle Bailey is created by Mort Walker.
 Darlington Raceway is the site of the inaugural Southern 500, the first 500-mile NASCAR race.
 September 7 – The game show Truth or Consequences debuts on television.
 September 8 – The Defense Production Act is enacted into law in the United States, shaping American military contracting for the next sixty years.
 September 9 – The U.S. state of California celebrates its centennial anniversary.
 September 15 – Korean War – Battle of Inchon: Allied troops commanded by Douglas MacArthur land in Inchon, occupied by North Korea, to begin a U.N. counteroffensive.
 September 30 – NSC 68 is approved by President Harry S. Truman, setting United States foreign policy for the next 20 years.

October–December
 October 2 – The comic strip Peanuts by Charles M. Schulz is first published in seven U.S. newspapers.
 October 7
 The Agate Pass Bridge opens for traffic in Washington State.
 The New York Yankees defeat the Philadelphia Phillies, 4 games to 0, to win their 13th World Series Title.
 October 11 – The Federal Communications Commission issues the first license to broadcast television in color, to CBS (RCA will successfully dispute and block the license from taking effect, however).
 October 15 – The second Tacoma Narrows Bridge opens.
 October 30 – The Jayuya Uprising is started by Puerto Rican Nationalists against the United States.
 November 1 – Puerto Rican nationalists Griselio Torresola and Oscar Collazo attempt to assassinate U.S. President Harry S. Truman, who is staying at the Blair-Lee House in Washington, D.C. during White House repairs.
 November 8 – Korean War: While in an F-80, United States Air Force Lt. Russell J. Brown intercepts two North Korean MiG-15s near the Yalu River and shoots them down in the first jet-to-jet dogfight in history.
 November 10 – A U.S. Air Force B-50 Superfortress bomber, experiencing an in-flight emergency, jettisons and detonates a Mark 4 nuclear bomb over Quebec, Canada (the device lacked its plutonium core).
 November 11 – The Mattachine Society is founded in Los Angeles as the first gay liberation organization.
 November 22 – Shirley Temple announces her retirement from show business.
 November 24–25 – Great Appalachian Storm of 1950: A phenomenal winter storm ravages the northeastern United States, brings 30 to 50 inches of snow, temperatures below zero, and kills 323 people.
 November 26 – Korean War: Troops from the People's Republic of China move into North Korea and launch a massive counterattack against South Korean and American forces at Chosin, dashing any hopes for a quick end to the conflict.
 November 29
 Korean War: North Korean and Chinese troops force a retreat of United Nations forces from North Korea.
 The National Council of the Churches of Christ in the USA is founded.
 November 30 – Douglas MacArthur threatens to use nuclear weapons in Korea.
 December 4 – The 1949 Smith Act trial of Communist Party leaders ("Foley Square trial") commences review in the Supreme Court of the United States, as Dennis v. United States.
 December 12 – Paula Ackerman becomes the first woman in the United States to serve a congregation as a Rabbi.
 December 16 – The Office of Defense Mobilization is established in the United States.

Undated
 President Harry S. Truman sends United States military advisors to Vietnam to aid French forces.
 The first TV remote control, Zenith Radio's Lazy Bones, is marketed.

Ongoing
 Cold War (1947–1991)
 Second Red Scare (1947–1957)
 Marshall Plan (1948–1951)
 Korean War (1950–1953)

Births 
 January 1 – Steve Ripley, country singer (d. 2019)
 January 2
 Grant Adcox, race car driver (d. 1989)
 David Shifrin, classical clarinetist
 January 4
 Michael R. Blanchfield, soldier (d. 1969)
 John Louis Evans, murderer (executed 1983)
 Carol J. Greenhouse, anthropologist 
 January 6
 Louis Freeh, Director of the FBI
 Thomas J. Pickard, acting director of the FBI
 January 7 – Ross Grimsley, baseball player and coach
 January 8 – Michael Kearns, actor
 January 9 – David Johansen, musician and actor
 January 10
 Roy Blunt, U.S. Senator from Missouri from 2011
 Ernie Wasson, gardener and writer
 January 11 – Joel Seligman, author
 January 12 – Sheila Jackson Lee, African-American politician
 January 15 – Bob Krause, politician
 January 19 – Jon Matlack, baseball player and coach
 January 20 – Edward Hirsch, poet
 January 23 – Suzanne Scotchmer, economist and academic (d. 2014)
 January 24 – Gennifer Flowers, actress, connected to Bill Clinton
 January 26 – Jack Youngblood, American football player, sportscaster and actor
 January 29 – Max Carl, singer-songwriter, guitarist and keyboard player
 January 30 – Trinidad Silva, actor (d. 1988)
 January 31 – Fred Karger, political consultant
 February 1 – Mike Campbell, musician 
 February 4
 Laurence Bergreen, historian and author
 Phil Ehart, drummer
 February 5 – Jonathan Freeman, actor and puppeteer
 February 6
 Natalie Cole, singer (d. 2015)
 Timothy Michael Dolan, Roman Catholic Cardinal, Archbishop of New York 
 February 7 – Karen Joy Fowler, author
 February 9
 Richard F. Colburn, Republican
 James Luna, performance artist
 February 12 – Margaret Warner, Senior correspondent of PBS
 February 15 – Donna Hanover, journalist
 February 17
 Mark Bittman, journalist
 Rickey Medlocke, musician
 February 19 – Donald Sanborn, reactor
 February 23 – Elizabeth Streb, choreographer
 February 24 – Steve McCurry, photographer and journalist
 February 26 – Bill Ritter, news anchor
 March 2 – Karen Carpenter, pop singer and drummer (d. 1983)
 March 3 – Mark Ciavarella, judge
 March 4 – Rick Perry, 47th Governor of Texas
 March 6 – Al Milgrom, comic book writer
 March 7
 Billy Joe DuPree, American football tight end
 Franco Harris, American football running back (d. 2022)
 Mark Pinter, actor
 March 10 – Catherine Pugh, Democratic politician and mayor of Baltimore
 March 11 – Steven Nock,  researcher, author, and university professor
 March 15
 Paul Gerken, tennis player
 Thommie Walsh, dancer, choreographer, director and author (d. 2007)
 March 16 – Jed Babbin, lawyer
 March 17
 Michael Been, rock musician (d. 2010)
 Linda Wolf, photographer and author
 March 19
 Zachary W. Carter, lawyer
 Leon McQuay, American football player (d. 1995) 
 March 20 – William Hurt, actor (d. 2022)
 March 26 – Alan Silvestri, composer and conductor
 March 27
 Robert DeLeo, politician
 Maria Ewing, operatic soprano (d. 2022)
 March 28 – Jeffrey Miller, Kent State University shooting victim (d. 1970) 
 March 31 – Ed Marinaro, American football player and actor (Hill Street Blues) 
 April 1 – Samuel Alito, Associate Justice of the Supreme Court of the U.S. from 2006
 April 2
 Erik Buell, motorcycle racer
 Ruth Wilson Gilmore, prison abolitionist and scholar
 Lynn Westmoreland, politician, U.S. House of Representatives from Georgia
 April 7
 Patricia Mauceri, actress 
 Richard Dien Winfield, philosopher
 April 8 – Carmen Twillie, actress and singer 
 April 9 – Kenneth Cockrell, astronaut
 April 10 – Ken Griffey, Sr., baseball player
 April 12
 David Cassidy, singer (d. 2017)
 Tom Werner, TV producer and businessman
 April 16
 David Graf, actor (d. 2001)
 Tony Huston, actor
 April 17 – Bruce McNall, businessman
 April 18 – Kenny Ortega, producer, director and choreographer
 April 19 – Lani Guinier, law professor (d. 2022)
 April 20 
 Steve Erickson, novelist
 Milt Wilcox, baseball player
 April 21
 Bobby Hutton, activist (d. 1968)  
 Dale Patchett, politician (Florida)
 April 25 – Lenora Fulani, African-American presidential candidate 
 April 26 – Glenn Patrick, ice hockey player
 April 28 – Bruce H. Mann, legal scholar
 April 29 – Debbie Stabenow, U.S. Senator from Michigan from 2001
 April 30
 Patrice Donnelly, actress
 Carl Stokes, politician (Baltimore)
 May 1
 John Diehl, actor
 Swanee Hunt, lecturer
 May 2
 Lou Gramm, rock singer-songwriter
 Moondog Rex, professional wrestler (d. 2019)
 May 3 – Jeffrey Sweet, writer and theater historian
 May 4 – Hilly Hicks, character actor
 May 5
 Joseph Abboud, fashion designer
 Elaine Fuchs, cell biologist
 Todd Strasser, writer
 May 6
 Jeffery Deaver, crime writer
 Jamie Gorelick, lawyer
 Joel Hyatt, entrepreneur
 May 7
 Prairie Prince, drummer
 Tim Russert, journalist (Meet the Press) (d. 2008)
 May 8 – Mark Blankfield, actor
 May 9
 James Butts, triple jumper
 Jorie Graham, poet
 Tom Petersson, bass player and songwriter
 May 11
 Dane Iorg, baseball player
 John F. Kelly, 5th United States Secretary of Homeland Security
 May 12
 Bruce Boxleitner, actor
 Billy Squier, musician
 May 13
 Joe Johnston, film director
 Bobby Valentine, baseball manager
 Stevie Wonder, musician, singer, songwriter, record producer and multi-instrumentalist
 May 14 – Jill Stein, Green Party nominee for President of the United States in the 2012 and 2016 elections
 May 15 
 Nicholas Hammond, American-Australian actor
 Jim Simons, golfer (d. 2005)
 May 18 – Mark Mothersbaugh, musician
 May 19 – George Leo Thomas, prelate of the Catholic Church
 May 20 – Alan Zweibel, television writer
 May 21 – Jeanne Moos, news correspondent
 May 23 
 William Barr, United States Attorney-General
 Linda Thompson (actress), songwriter
 May 24 – Thomas DeSimone, gangster
 May 25 – Ed Emery, politician, Missouri State Senate
 May 26 – David Ignatius, journalist and novelist
 May 28
 Denny Delk, actor and voice actor
 Arthur Firstenberg, author
 Kamala, professional wrestler (d. 2020)
 May 29 – Rebbie Jackson, singer
 May 31 – Gregory Harrison, actor and director
 June 1 
 John M. Jackson, film and television actor
 Michael McDowell, novelist and screenwriter (d. 1999)
 June 3
 Melissa Mathison, screenwriter (d. 2015)
 Ann Pennington, model
 Suzi Quatro, singer, songwriter
 Robert Z’Dar, actor (d. 2015)
 June 6 – Andrew Napolitano, columnist
 June 7 – Howard Finkel, ring announcer (d. 2020)
 June 8 – Kathy Baker, actress
 June 9 – Keith Kauffman, race car driver
 June 10 – Gary Westfall, physicist
 June 12 – Sonia Manzano, actress
 June 16 – Jerry Petrowski, politician and farmer
 June 17 
 David Boggs, computer scientist (d. 2022)
 William P. Callahan, religious leader
 June 18
 Mike Johanns, U.S. Senator from Nebraska
 Joe Sam Queen, North Carolina politician
 June 19 – Ann Wilson, singer, musician ((Heart))
 June 23
 Dave Butz, American football player (d. 2022)
 Tracy Potter, historian and politician
 June 27 – Michael O'Brien, photographer
 June 28 – Steve Downes, DJ and voice actor
 June 29 – Don Moen, Christian musician
 July 1
 David Duke, politician and Grand Wizard of the Ku Klux Klan
 Ricardo Montano, legislator
 July 4 – Steven Sasson, electrical engineer
 July 5 
 Huey Lewis, actor, musician and songwriter
 Michael Monarch, guitarist, songwriter and producer 
 July 9 – Gwen Guthrie, pianist and singer-songwriter (d. 1999)
 July 11 – Michael C. Stenger, law enforcement officer (d. 2022)
 July 18
 Glenn Hughes, vocalist (The Village People) (d. 2001)
 Mark Souder, politician and businessman from Indiana (d. 2022)
 Mark Udall, U.S. Senator from Colorado from 2009 to 2015
 July 19 – Freddy Moore, musician (d. 2022)
 July 20 – William Knox Schroeder, Kent State University shooting victim (d. 1970)
 July 30 – Frank Stallone, actor
 August 1
 Bunkhouse Buck, professional wrestler
 Roy Williams, basketball coach
 August 2 – Lance Ito, judge
 August 3
 John Landis, film director
 Jo Marie Payton, actress
 August 11
 Erik Brann, musician (Iron Butterfly) (d. 2003)
 Steve Wozniak, inventor
 August 12
 Jim Beaver, actor, playwright, screenwriter and film historian
 George McGinnis, basketball player
 August 15
 Tom Kelly, baseball player and manager
 Andres Serrano, photographer
 August 21 – Arthur Bremer, attempted assassin of George Wallace
 August 24
 John Banaszak, football player and coach
Tim D. White, paleoanthropologist and academic
 August 25 – Charles Fambrough, musician and composer (d. 2011)
 August 26
 Carl Deuker, author
 Benjamin Hendrickson, actor (d. 2006)
 August 31 – Dean Barkley, U.S. Senator from Minnesota from 2002 to 2003
 September 1 – Dr. Phil, psychologist and TV host
 September 2
 Rosanna DeSoto, actress
 Harvey Levin, founder of TMZ
 September 8 – James Mattis, 26th United States Secretary of Defense
 September 11 – Amy Madigan, actress
 September 15 – Mike Nifong North Carolina district attorney disbarred for misconduct in the Duke lacrosse case
 September 16
 Henry Louis Gates Jr., African-American literary critic
 Loyd Grossman, television presenter and chef
 September 17 –  Robert Slavin, psychologist (d. 2021)
 September 19 – Joan Lunden, television broadcaster and journalist (Good Morning America)
 September 21
 Bill Murray, comedian and actor
 David Frawley, author
 September 24 – Alan Colmes, TV/radio host and political commentator (d. 2017)
 September 28
 Christina Hoff Sommers, author and philosopher
 John Sayles, director and screenwriter 
 September 29 – Leroy Jones, American footballer (d. 2021)
 October 3
 Pamela Hensley, actress
 Phyllis Nelson, singer-songwriter (d. 1998)
 October 5 – Jeff Conaway, actor (Taxi) (d. 2011)
 October 9
 Everett Peck, illustrator, comics artist, cartoonist and animator
 Jody Williams, teacher, aid worker and recipient of the Nobel Peace Prize
 October 11 – Patty Murray, U.S. Senator from Washington from 1993
 October 12 – Edward Bloor, novelist
 October 14 – Joey Travolta, actor
 October 16
 Cecil Bothwell, atheist writer, politician
 Angry Grandpa, internet personality (d. 2017)
 October 20 – Tom Petty, rock singer-songwriter (d. 2017)
 October 22
 Bill Owens, 40th Governor of Colorado
 Patricia Parris, actress and voice actress
 October 24
 Rawly Eastwick, baseball player
 Steven Greenberg, singer-songwriter and producer
 Tom Myers, American football player
 October 25 – Mark L. Taylor, actor
 October 30 – Louise DuArt, comedian and impersonator
 October 31 – Jane Pauley, television broadcast journalist (The Today Show)
 November 1
 Robert B. Laughlin, physicist, Nobel Prize laureate
 Dan Peek, musician (America) (d. 2011)
 November 4 – Charles Frazier, novelist
 November 6 – Kenny Marks, Christian musician
 November 8 – Mary Hart, television personality
 November 10
 Debra Hill, producer (d. 2005)
 Bob Orton, Jr., professional wrestler
 November 12 – Barbara Fairchild, singer-songwriter
 November 13 – Mary Lou Metzger, singer and dancer
 November 16 – David Leisure, actor
 November 21 – David Williams, singer, songwriter, musician and producer (d. 2009)
 November 22
 Jim Lang, composer
 Lyman Bostock, baseball player (d. 1978)
 November 23 – Chuck Schumer, U.S. Senator from New York from 1999
 November 24 – Stanley Livingston, actor
 November 28
 Ed Harris, actor, screenwriter and director
 Russell Alan Hulse, physicist, Nobel Prize laureate
 Kenneth Fisher, financial manager and journalist
 November 30 – Paul Westphal, basketball player and coach (d. 2021)
 December 1 – Richard Keith (b. Keith Thibodeaux), child actor
 December 2 – Bob Kevoian, radio host
 December 3 – Asa Hutchinson, 46th Governor of Arkansas
 December 10
 John Boozman, U.S. Senator from Arkansas from 2011
 Tom Towles, actor (d. 2015)
 Gregg Berger, voice actor
 December 12 – Darleen Carr, actress
 December 13 – Wendie Malick, American-Canadian actress
 December 15 – Sylvester James Gates, theoretical physicist
 December 17 – Laurence F. Johnson, futurist and educator
 December 18 – Leonard Maltin, film critic
 December 20 – Don Heffington, percussionist and songwriter (d. 2021)
 December 23 – Michael C. Burgess, politician
 December 24 – Deborah J. Glick, democratic member
 December 25 – Ed Hochuli, American football official
 December 28 – Alex Chilton, rock musician (The Box Tops) (d. 2010)
 December 29 – Jon Polito, actor (d. 2016)

Deaths
 January 2 – Anthony Prusinski, politician (b. 1901)
 January 15 – Henry H. Arnold, five-star general (b. 1886)
 January 22 – Alan Hale, Sr., actor  (b. 1892)
 February 7 – William Murphy, Roman Catholic bishop (b. 1885)
 February 11 – Kiki Cuyler, baseball player (Chicago Cubs) and a member of the MLB Hall of Fame (b. 1898)
 February 25 – George Minot, physician, recipient of the Nobel Prize in Physiology or Medicine (b. 1885)
 February 27 – Harold Clarke Goddard, Shakespearean scholar (b. 1878)
 March 11 – Heinrich Mann, German writer, died in Santa Monica, California (b. 1871)
 April 1 – Charles R. Drew, African American physician, pioneer in blood transfusion, died as result of automobile accident (b. 1904)
 April 7 – Walter Huston, actor  (b. 1883)
 April 11 – Bainbridge Colby, United States Secretary of State  (b. 1869)
 April 16 – Henry J. Knauf, politician (b. 1891)
 April 26 – G. Murray Hulbert, politician (b. 1881)
 April 27 – Hobart Cavanaugh, character actor (b. 1886)
 May 1 – Lothrop Stoddard, eugenicist (b. 1883)
 May 10 – Belle da Costa Greene, librarian, bibliographer and archivist (b. 1883)
 May 20 – John Gould Fletcher, poet (b. 1886)
 June 22 – Jane Cowl, actress  (b. 1883)
 July 7 – Fats Navarro, jazz trumpet player  (b. 1923)
 July 8 – Helen Holmes, actress (b. 1893)
 July 10 – Richard Maury, American naturalized Argentine engineer (b. 1882)
 July 11 – Buddy DeSylva, songwriter  (b. 1895)
 July 12 – Elsie de Wolfe, socialite and interior decorator (b. 1865)
 July 21 – Rex Ingram, director (b. 1892)
 August 19 – Black Elk, Wičháša Wakȟáŋ (Medicine Man or Holy Man) of the Ogala Teton Lakota (Western Sioux) (b. 1863)
 August 22 – Kirk Bryan, geologist (b. 1888)
 August 23 – Frank Phillips, oil executive (b. 1873)
 August 26 – Ransom E. Olds, automotive pioneer (b. 1864)
 September 10 – Raymond Sommer, race car driver (b. 1906)
 September 16 – Pedro de Cordoba, actor  (b. 1881)
 September 30 − Sheldon Willard Dowell, businessman (b. 1897)
 October 11 – Pauline Lord, actress  (b. 1890)
 October 13 – Ernest Haycox, writer (b. 1899)
 October 19 – Edna St. Vincent Millay, poet (b. 1892)
 October 20 – Henry L. Stimson, United States Secretary of State (b. 1867)
 October 23 – Al Jolson, musician and actor (b. 1886)
 October 28 – Maurice Costello, actor  (b. 1877)
 November 4 – Grover Cleveland Alexander, baseball player (Philadelphia Phillies) and a member of the MLB Hall of Fame (b. 1887)
 November 8 – Bernice Herstein, socialite (b. 1918)
 November 9 – Maude Fulton, playwright and actress (b. 1881)
 December 4 – Jesse L. Brown, first African-American aviator in the United States Navy (killed in action) (b. 1926)
 December 7 – Evelyn Selbie, actress (b. 1871)
 December 28 – Max Beckmann, German painter and graphic artist, died in New York City, New York (b. 1884)

See also
 List of American films of 1950
 Timeline of United States history (1950–1969)

References

External links
 

 
1950s in the United States
United States
United States
Years of the 20th century in the United States